The Offaly county football team represents Offaly in men's Gaelic football and is governed by Offaly GAA, the county board of the Gaelic Athletic Association. The team competes in the three major annual inter-county competitions; the All-Ireland Senior Football Championship, the Leinster Senior Football Championship and the National Football League.

Offaly's home ground is O'Connor Park, Tullamore. The team's manager is Liam Kearns.

The team last won the Leinster Senior Championship in 1997, the All-Ireland Senior Championship in 1982 and the National League in 1998.

History
Perhaps the most famous moment in football history came in the 1982 All-Ireland Senior Football Championship Final when Offaly played Kerry. The match was a repeat of the previous year's final; however, not only that but a win for Kerry would give them an unprecedented fifth consecutive All-Ireland SFC title. Kerry were winning by two points with two minutes to go when Séamus Darby came on as a substitute and scored one of the most famous goals of all time in football. Kerry fumbled the counterattack which allowed Offaly to win by one single point with a score of 1–15 to 0–17.

The Offaly vocational schools' team have made it to six All-Ireland finals but lost all six, including the first final when they were beaten by the Cork City team in 1961.

Support
Professional golfer Shane Lowry said in 2021: "But any time I get the chance to go to O'Connor Park and watch Offaly play, I do and I am the first to give out if they lose and I am sitting in the stand."

Current panel

Current management team
Manager: Liam Kearns, appointed 11 August 2022
Selectors: Martin Murphy, John Rouse
Coach: Alan Flynn
Backroom: Brendan Egan, Paul Fitzgerald
Strength and conditioning coach: Keith Carr

Managerial history
Offaly have a history of appointing "foreign" managers, doing so on several occasions since taking Eugene McGee from Longford in late 1976. Emmet McDonnell became the tenth foreigner to manage the team when he was appointed in 2012. Only Tommy Lyons was a successful appointment though; Lyons led Offaly to the 1997 Leinster SFC (a first in 15 years) and then to a first National Football League Division 1 title the following year. According to Colm Keys, writing in the Irish Independent after the Offaly County Board sacked Stephen Wallace in May 2018: "In the quest for perfection, Offaly have repeatedly left themselves in a right old mess when it has come to choosing and retaining managers... No county has experienced such managerial upheaval as Offaly since the turn of the century".

Players

Records
Tony McTague is the team's top scorer in National Football League history, finishing his career with 9–360 (387) in that competition.
Cillian O'Connor of Mayo became the highest scoring player in the All-Ireland Senior Football Championship, surpassing the record of Kerry's Colm Cooper, a feat O'Connor achieved against Kerry during a defeat in Killarney in 2019. He had done this by scoring in all of his previous 51 previous championship matches prior to the record breaking match, except for one game against London in 2013 when he had been black carded, a rate of scoring in the competition only previously seen from Offaly's Matt Connor.

Most appearances

The following are among those to have made the highest number of appearances for the senior team:

All Stars

Colours and crest

Kit evolution

Team sponsorship
The food company Carroll's of Tullamore has sponsored Offaly since the GAA first permitted shirt sponsorship deals in 1991. It is thus the sport's longest running shirt sponsor.

Professional golfer Shane Lowry and Offaly announced a five-year partnership in April 2021.

Honours

National
All-Ireland Senior Football Championship 
 Winners (3): 1971, 1972, 1982
 Runners-up (3): 1961, 1969, 1981

National Football League
 Winners (1): 1997–98
 Runners-up (2): 1968–69, 1972–73
National Football League Division 4
 Winners (1): 2015
All-Ireland Under-21 Football Championship
 Winners (1): 1988
 Runners-up (2): 1968, 1986
All-Ireland Under-20 Football Championship
 Winners (1): 2021
All-Ireland Minor Football Championship
 Winners (1): 1964
 Runners-up (1): 1989

Provincial
Leinster Senior Football Championship
 Winners (10): 1960, 1961, 1969, 1971, 1972, 1973, 1980, 1981, 1982, 1997
 Runners-up (9): 1907, 1945, 1954, 1962, 1967, 1970, 1979, 1983, 2006
O'Byrne Cup
 Winners (6): 1954, 1961, 1981, 1993, 1997, 1998
Leinster Junior Football Championship
 Winners (4): 1935, 1972, 1998, 2001
Leinster Under-21 Football Championship
 Winners (8): 1968, 1971, 1973, 1977, 1979, 1986, 1988, 1995
 Runners-up (7): 1964, 1965, 1970, 1972, 1978, 2007, 2017
Leinster Under-20 Football Championship
 Winners (1): 2021
Leinster Minor Football Championship
 Winners (6): 1947, 1960, 1962, 1964, 1965, 1989
 Runners-up (13): 1948, 1957, 1959, 1961, 1966, 1976, 1985, 2001, 2005, 2006, 2008, 2010, 2020

References

 
County football teams